Tommaso Pobega ( born 15 July 1999) is an Italian professional footballer who plays as a midfielder for  club AC Milan and the Italy national team.

Club career

AC Milan
Pobega appeared in friendlies for the main squad of Milan in the autumn of 2016.

Loan to Ternana
On 23 August 2018, Pobega joined to Serie C club Ternana on loan for the 2018–19 season. On 7 October he made his professional debut in Serie C for Ternana as a substitute replacing Giuseppe Vives in the 73rd minute of a 1–1 home draw against Renate. Two weeks later he was sent-off, as a substitute, with a double yellow card in the 87th minute of a 1–1 away draw against Triestina. On 7 November he played his first entire match for Ternana, a 1–0 away win over Fano. On 27 December he scored his first professional goal in the 69th minute of a 2–1 home win over Teramo. On 9 February 2019, Pobega scored twice in a 2–2 home draw against Virtus Verona. Pobega ended his season-long loan to Ternana with 32 appearances, 3 goals and 3 assists.

Loan to Pordenone
On 15 July 2019, Pobega joined Serie B club Pordenone a loan until 30 June 2020. On 11 August he made his debut and he scored his first goal for the club in the 44th minute of a 2–1 home defeat against FeralpiSalò in the second round of Coppa Italia, he played the entire match. On 26 August he made his Serie B debut for Pordenone and he scored twice in a 3–0 home win over against Frosinone, he was replaced by Simone Pasa after 81 minutes. Five days later he played his first entire match in Serie B, a 4–2 away defeat against Pescara. On 5 October, Pobega scored his third goal in Serie B in the 40th minute of a 2–0 home win over Empoli.

Loan to Spezia
On 24 August 2020, Pobega signed a new contract with Milan until 30 June 2025. On 23 September 2020, Pobega joined promoted Serie A club Spezia on loan until 30 June 2021. On 27 September, he made his debut for Spezia in a 4–1 home defeat to Sassuolo. On 1 November 2020, he scored his first goal for Spezia in a 4–1 home defeat to Juventus.

Return to AC Milan
Pobega returned to AC Milan for the 2021–22 preseason. He made his first appearance for the club on 17 July 2021, in the friendly match won 6–0 against Pro Sesto. 

On 5 August 2022, Pobega extended his contract until 30 June 2027. He scored his first competitive goal on 14th September 2022 against Dinamo Zagreb in Champions League match coming in as a substitute.

Loan to Torino
On 27 August 2021, Pobega joined Torino on loan until 30 June 2022.

International career
On 12 November 2020, Pobega made his debut with the Italy U21 team, starting in a qualifying match 2–1 away win over Iceland, scoring both of the goals for Italy.

He has been called up by the national team for the first time on 5 November 2021, for the matches against Switzerland and Northern Ireland for the 2022 FIFA World Cup qualifiers.

Career statistics

Club

International

References

External links

 Profile at the AC Milan website
 

Living people
1999 births
Footballers from Trieste
Italian footballers
Association football midfielders
A.C. Milan players
Ternana Calcio players
Pordenone Calcio players
Spezia Calcio players
Torino F.C. players
Serie C players
Serie B players
Serie A players
Italy under-21 international footballers
Italy youth international footballers